is a Japanese fiction writer and literary critic.  Takenishi is best known for her semi-autobiographical short story "The Rite" (1963), which tells of her experience surviving the Atomic Bombing of Hiroshima. In 2012 she was named a Person of Cultural Merit for her writing.

References

External links
 Hiroko Takenishi at J'Lit Books from Japan 

1929 births
Japanese women writers
Living people
Hibakusha